The Ratle Hydroelectric Plant is a run-of-the-river hydroelectric power station currently under construction on the Chenab River, downstream of the village near Drabshalla in Kishtwar district of the Indian Union Territory of Jammu and Kashmir. The main power station will contain four 205 MW Francis turbines and the auxiliary power station will contain one 30 MW Francis turbine. The installed capacity of both power stations will be 850 MW. On 25 June 2013, Prime Minister Manmohan Singh laid the foundation stone for the dam. Pakistan has frequently alleged that it violates the Indus Waters Treaty.

Project Status
 As of June 2015, the project is yet to start.
 In August 2017, the World Bank allowed India to construct the dam. It happened after Pakistan alleged that the construction of the dam was not in line with the Indus Water Treaty.
 The project was supposed to be complete in February 2018. In October 2018, the state government approached the central government with joint venture proposals to resume construction. If a proposal is accepted, completion is expected at earliest in 2022.
 In November, 2018, India decided to activate the construction of the project considering Pakistan's objection invalid under Indus Waters Treaty obligations.
 A Memorandum of Understanding (MoU) was exchanged among NHPC Limited, Jammu & Kashmir State Power Development Department (JKPDD) and J&K State Power Development Corporation (JKSPDC) for execution of 850 MW Ratle Hydroelectric Project in the presence of Prime Minister, Narendra Modi at Vijaypur in Samba district of Jammu on 3 February 2019.
In December 2019, construction works were started by India, pushing Pakistan to send the World Bank new protests against the dam.
 A fresh Supplementary MOU between NHPC, JKSPDC has been signed on dated 03.01.2021 to execute the project through a Joint Venture Company (JVC). In the supplementary MoU, the clause of MoU dated 3 February 2019 regarding purchase of NHPCs equity by JKSPDCL from the end of the 5th year after date of commissioning over 15 years through equal installments have been deleted.  Now, the share of NHPC in the Joint Venture Company shall not be brought below 51% and share of JKSPDCL shall not be brought below 49%.
 The previous MOU between GVK and JKSPDC was called off, since the construction of project was left over by GVK.
 Construction of the project has been started by the EPC contractor "MEGHA
ENGINEERING"

See also

Dul Hasti Hydroelectric Plant – located upstream
Baglihar Dam – located downstream
Sawalkot dam - Proposed dam between Baglihar and Salal dams
Salal Hydroelectric Power Station – located downstream of Baglihar dam

References

Dams in Jammu and Kashmir
Dams under construction
Dams on the Chenab River
Hydroelectric power stations in Jammu and Kashmir
Gravity dams
Run-of-the-river power stations